Adrian Crișan (born 7 May 1980) is a Romanian professional table tennis player who currently plays with SV Werder Bremen. He competed in the Summer Olympic Games in 2000, 2004, 2008, 2012 and 2016. He ranked as high as #10 in the World Rankings in January 2006, and is ranked #52 .

Crișan is a ten-time singles champion of Romania (2002, 2004, 2005, 2006, 2007, 2008, 2010, 2011, 2012, 2013).

He is currently trained by Cristian Tamaș.

Clubs 
1996–1997:  CSM Bistriţa
1997–1999:  1. FC Bayreuth
1999–2000:  SV Plüderhausen
2000–2010:  TTF Liebherr Ochsenhausen
2010–2015:  SV Werder Bremen
2015–2020:  Stella Sport La Romagne

References

External links
 
 
 
 
 
 

Romanian male table tennis players
Olympic table tennis players of Romania
Table tennis players at the 2000 Summer Olympics
Table tennis players at the 2004 Summer Olympics
Table tennis players at the 2008 Summer Olympics
Table tennis players at the 2012 Summer Olympics
Table tennis players at the 2016 Summer Olympics
Living people
1980 births
Sportspeople from Bistrița
Table tennis players at the 2015 European Games
European Games competitors for Romania
Romanian Christians
20th-century Romanian people
21st-century Romanian people